The Testament of Jacob is a work now regarded as part of the Old Testament apocrypha. It is often treated as one of a trio of very similar works, the other two of which are the Testament of Abraham and Testament of Isaac, though there is no reason to assume that they were originally a single work. All three works are based on the Blessing of Jacob, found in the Bible, in their style. Christian elements are usually regarded as later additions to what were originally purely Jewish works.

Content 
The Testament of Jacob begins with Jacob being visited by the archangel Michael who told of his impending death. Jacob was then taken on a visit to heaven, where he first sees the torture of the sinful dead, then later meets the deceased Abraham. In this Testament, it is the angels that Jacob meets who deliver the bulk of the sermonising passages.

See also 

 Testaments of the Three Patriarchs

References 

Jacob
Apocrypha
1st-century books
2nd-century books
Old Testament pseudepigrapha
Jewish apocrypha
Apocalyptic literature
Texts in Koine Greek
Roman Egypt